Stinson may refer to:

Stinson, Ontario
Stinson (surname)
Stinson Aircraft Company
Stinson Lake, in the White Mountains of New Hampshire, in the town of Rumney
Stinson Municipal Airport, San Antonio, Texas
Stinson Theatres, a Canadian movie theatre chain
Stinson Records, an American folk and blues music label
Stinson Beach, California
Stinson Beach School
Stinson Gulch